Ghawrath ibn al-Harith also known as Du'thar ibn al-Harith was a companion (Sahaba) of Muhammad. He was the first person to try and assassinate Muhammad during the Invasion of Dhi Amr.

Assassination attempt 
According to Muslim scholar Sami Strauch, it is reported in Sahih Bukhari that it was raining, and Muhammad took his garments off and hung them on a tree to dry. While the enemy was watching, Ghawrath ibn al-Harith went to attack Muhammad. He threatened Muhammad with his sword and said "who will protect you from me on this day". Then, according to Muslim scholars, the Angel Gabriel appeared, thumped Ghawrath in the chest and forced him to drop his sword. Muhammad then picked up the sword and said "who will protect you from me" then he forgave him.

Sahih al Bukhari mentions this incident:

See also
List of expeditions of Muhammad

References

Companions of the Prophet
Date of birth unknown
Angelic visionaries
Date of death unknown
Place of birth unknown
Place of death unknown